Henry Mish Barn, also known as Mish Barn and Heritage Hill Barn, is a historic Pennsylvania bank barn located near Middlebrook, Augusta County, Virginia. It was built about 1849, and measures 50 feet by 100 feet.  The ends of the barn feature decorative brick lattice vents in lozenge patterns, a feature prevalent in Pennsylvania barns. It is one of the few pre-American Civil War examples to have survived the Valley barn-burning campaigns by Union forces. Associated with the brick barn are the contributing Mish House and two related outbuildings.  The barn was built for Henry Mish, a native of York County, Pennsylvania who settled in southwestern Augusta County in 1839.

It was listed on the National Register of Historic Places in 1983.

References

Barns on the National Register of Historic Places in Virginia
Buildings and structures completed in 1849
Buildings and structures in Augusta County, Virginia
National Register of Historic Places in Augusta County, Virginia
1849 establishments in Virginia
Barns in Virginia